Union Pacific 6936 is an EMD DDA40X locomotive built for the Union Pacific Railroad (UP). Previously a part of UP's heritage fleet, 6936 was for several decades the last remaining operational "Centennial" type, and thus the largest operational diesel-electric locomotive in the world. It is now owned by the Railroading Heritage of Midwest America in Silvis, Illinois, who plans to return the locomotive to operation.

History

Service with Union Pacific
Built in January 1971, the UP classifies No. 6936 as a DD40X rather than a DDA40X as indicated by the model designation on the cab of the locomotive. It served in revenue service over the next decade and into the mid-1980s across the Union Pacific system. UP 6936 made its last regular freight trip on May 6, 1985. It went on to become a part of the railroad's excursion fleet.

The locomotive's last excursion with UP was in 2015, when it helped the UP's trio of EMD E9 units at the annual Cheyenne Frontier Days event. It was last used on July 12, 2016, when it helped to test UP 844, a steam locomotive being returned to service. Its dynamic brakes were used to simulate a load while being pulled. After the tests, it was placed into storage at the roundhouse in Cheyenne.

The current operating condition of No. 6936 is unclear. As of 2017, a page posted on UP's website said the locomotive "now travels on occasion as part of the UP Heritage Fleet." But a page posted in 2019 does not describe No. 6936 as operational.

Accident
In November 2000, UP 6936 collided with a dump truck at a grade crossing in Livonia, Louisiana. The accident killed a railroad employee riding on the nose section and the driver of the dump truck. The unit was stored in North Little Rock, Arkansas, until damage to its nose could be repaired.

Acquisition by RRHMA  
In April 2022, Union Pacific announced that 6936—along with Union Pacific 3985, Union Pacific 5511, and several other pieces of equipment stored at the Cheyenne roundhouse—were to be donated to the Railroading Heritage of Midwest America, with plans to return the locomotive to operation. In November of that same year, UP moved 6936 and the rest of the donated equipment to the RRHMA's large shop facility in Silvis, Illinois. As of 2023, No. 6936 remains stored, awaiting an inspection to allow a future return to operation.

References

External links 

 , maintained by Union Pacific Railroad
 , maintained by Railroading Heritage of Midwest America

6936
D-D locomotives
Electro-Motive Division locomotives
Diesel-electric locomotives of the United States
Standard gauge locomotives of the United States